Piano, Strings and Bossa Nova is an album by Argentine composer, pianist and conductor Lalo Schifrin recorded in 1962 and released on the MGM label.

Track listing
All compositions by Lalo Schifrin except as indicated
 "The Wave" - 2:43 
 "Insensatez" (Vinicius de Moraes, Antonio Carlos Jobim) - 2:22 
 "You and Me (Voce e Eu)" (de Moraes, Carlos Lyra) - 1:48 
 "Lalo's Bossa Nova (Samba Para Dos)" - 2:17 
 "Silvia" - 3:11 
 "Murmurio" (Luiz Antonio, Djaima Ferreira) - 2:01 
 "Maria" (Leonard Bernstein, Stephen Sondheim) - 2:29 
 "Rapaz de Bem" (Johnny Alf) - 2:34 
 "Samba Do Perroquet (Parrot Samba)" (Ferreira, Ivono Rebella) - 2:04 
 "Rio After Dark" - 2:33 
 "Time for Love" (Leonard Feather) - 2:26 
 "Four Leaf Clover" (Harry M. Woods, Mort Dixon) - 1:50 
Recorded in New York City on October 23 (tracks 1-6) and October 24 (tracks 7-12), 1962

Personnel
Lalo Schifrin - piano, arranger
Jim Hall - guitar
Christopher White - bass
Rudy Collins - drums
Jose Paulo, Carmen Costa - Latin percussion
Unidentified harp and strings

References

MGM Records albums
Lalo Schifrin albums
1962 albums
Albums produced by Creed Taylor
Albums arranged by Lalo Schifrin
Instrumental albums